The men's tournament of football at the 2013 Summer Universiade was held from July 5 to 16 in Kazan, Russia.

Teams

Preliminary round

Pool A

Pool B

Pool C

Pool D

Classification rounds

Quarterfinal round

9th–16th place

Semifinal round

13th–16th place

9th–12th place

Elimination round

Quarterfinals

Semifinals

5th–8th place

1st–4th place

Final round

13th-place game

11th-place game

9th-place game

7th-place game

5th-place game

Bronze-medal match

Gold-medal match

Final standings

References

Men's